Brachypleura novaezeelandiae, the yellow-dabbled flounder or yellow citharid, is a species of citharid flounder native to the western and central Indo-Pacific. This species is the only known member of the genus Brachypleura.

References
 

Pleuronectiformes
Monotypic marine fish genera
Taxa named by Albert Günther